The Witcher: Blood Origin is a fantasy miniseries created by Declan de Barra and Lauren Schmidt Hissrich and loosely adapted from The Witcher book series by Andrzej Sapkowski. It serves as a prequel to The Witcher. The series premiered on December 25, 2022 on Netflix, and consists of four episodes. It received largely negative reviews from critics and audiences, with criticism for its writing, story, characters, acting, and unfaithfulness to the lore, although the action sequences did receive some praise.

Premise
Set 1,200 years before the events of The Witcher television series, Blood Origin depicts the creation of the first Witcher, as well as the events leading to the "Conjunction of the Spheres". It also explores the ancient Elven civilization Xin'trea before its demise. Geralt of Rivia's bard ally Jaskier is saved from a war by the mysterious elf Seanchai where she has him write down the untold legend of seven warriors who went up against the forces of Xin'trea following its coup d'état.

Cast and characters

Main

 Sophia Brown as Éile, a warrior of the Queen's guard and member of the Raven Clan who leaves to become a traveling musician
 Minee Mais as young Éile
 Laurence O'Fuarain as Fjall, an elf born into a clan of warriors called the Dog Clan sworn to protect a king, but instead sets out in need of vengeance after the Empress betrays his clan. To enable do to so, he had to undergo a painful and life-threatening transformation that increased his strength, senses, agility, reflexes, healing and gaining poison resistance and immunity to most illnesses but rendering him sterile and emotionless therefore becoming "The First Witcher".
 Mirren Mack as Merwyn, the history-obsessed Princess of Xin'trea whose life is controlled by her brother King Alvatir, but who seeks to forge her own path
 Lenny Henry as Chief Druid Balor, a mage who has learned how to open gates to other worlds and has a plan of his own
 Jacob Collins-Levy as Eredin, the commander of the Xin'trean army, but with several secrets
 Joey Batey as Jaskier, a bard who once traveled with Geralt of Rivia and who is saved from likely death by the mysterious Seanchai
 Zach Wyatt as Syndril, the elfin mage who has discovered how to open gates between worlds
 Lizzie Annis as Zacaré, an elfin mage who is Syndril's celestial twin
 Huw Novelli as Callan "Brother Death", a retired sellsword who tracks down Éile, Fjall and Scían
 Francesca Mills as Meldof, a dwarf on a quest of revenge who wields a war hammer named after her late wife Gwen who was raped and killed by Xin'trean soldiers
 Amy Murray as Fenrik, Balor's druid apprentice who is deaf

 Minnie Driver as Seanchai, a mysterious figure who rescues Jaskier because she wants him to tell a tale about the "Conjunction of the Spheres"

 Michelle Yeoh as Scían, the last member of a nomadic tribe of sword-elves called the Ghost Clan who is on a mission to retrieve a blade stolen from her people

 Dylan Moran as Uthrok One-Nut, a sellsword colleague of Scían's

Supporting
 Mark Rowley as Alvatir, the King of Xin'trea and brother of Merwynn who tried to unify the clans
 Hiftu Quasem as Voice of Light, an unknown being who Balor interacts with in another world.
 Ella Schrey-Yeats as Ithlinne, a young girl with powers of vision with whome Eile becomes friends
 Ozioma Whenu as Níamh, the sister of Eile
 Kim Adis as Ket, the servant of Merwynn
 Kerri Quinn as Aevenien, the mother of Ithlinne
 Karlina Grace-Paseda as Cethlenn, the chief of raven clan and the mother of Eile and Níamh
 Shanika Ocean as young Cethlenn
 Tomisin Ajani as Captain Olyf
 Samuel Blenkin as Avallac'h, a young mage who rescues Merwynn and becomes her protector
 Nathaniel Curtis as Brían, an elf marchand and Eredin's lover
 Aidan O'Callaghan as Kareg, the deceased brother of Fjall
 Zachary Hart as Leifur
 Hebe Beardsall as Catrin, a villager who leads the revolt

Episodes

Production
It was announced in July 2020 that Netflix had greenlit a six-part miniseries prequel to their television series adaptation of the Andrzej Sapkowski novels. Declan de Barra was hired to serve as showrunner. In January 2021, Jodie Turner-Smith was cast to star in the series. 
Laurence O’Fuarain would join the cast in March, but by April, Turner-Smith had to exit due to scheduling conflicts. In July, Michelle Yeoh was added, with Sophia Brown taking over the role vacated by Turner-Smith.

Filming on the series began in August 2021 in the United Kingdom, with additional castings including Lenny Henry, Mirren Mack, Nathaniel Curtis and Dylan Moran announced. De Bara announced it had finished filming and went into post-production in November 2021.

The first trailer for the series was released on December 17, 2021. Another teaser trailer was released on November 10, 2022.

Reception
 On Metacritic, which uses a weighted average, the series has received a score of 45 out of 100 based on 15 critic reviews, indicating "mixed or average reviews".  

David Griffin reviewing it for IGN praised it for special effects, action scenes, and the "engaging band of misfits" as protagonists, but noted that the story villains were not very interesting. Zosha Millman reviewing the series for Polygon criticized it for being mundane, writing that the show "has no time for consideration of what makes the Witcher universe unique or meaningful at all, leaving it as just a muddled, reckless attempt to get more Witcher stuff out the door". Andrew Webster writing for The Verge likewise argued that without the titular Witcher (Geralt of Rivia) or another memorable lead, the series lacks something special to make it stand on its own. Therese Lacson writing for the Collider criticized the series for its "slapdash storylines" and "half-baked" villains, and noted that too often the show "slips into either complete camp, cringe, or melodrama" . Darren Mooney reviewing the show for The Escapist called it a "bloody mess" and a "spectacular misfire", criticizing its characters as uninteresting, and "editorial tinkering" as clumsy and ineffective.  In Slant Magazine, Niv M. Sultan wrote that "the series proves too hurried and scattered to penetrate much beyond the surface of its universe and characters." Vicky Jessop in the London Evening Standard said that "it's hard to feel invested in the fate of the characters". David Opie writing for Digital Spy likewise criticized the cast, noting that "Most of these characters, and therefore Blood Origin itself, remain frustratingly limited".

References

External links
 
 

2022 American television series debuts
2022 American television series endings
2020s American drama television miniseries
American action adventure television series
American fantasy drama television series
American prequel television series
Dark fantasy television series
English-language Netflix original programming
High fantasy television series
Polish drama television series
Polish fantasy television series
Serial drama television series
Television about magic
Television series based on novels
Television shows based on Polish novels
Television shows filmed in the United Kingdom
Witchcraft in television
Wizards in television
Blood Origin